Christopher Brooke (died 1628) was an English poet, lawyer and politician who sat in the House of Commons between 1604 and 1626.

Christopher Brooke may also refer to:

Christopher N. L. Brooke (1927–2015), British medieval historian
Christopher Brooke (British Army officer) (1869–1948), Conservative MP for Pontefract
Christopher Brooke, of Basso & Brooke

See also
Chris Brooks (disambiguation)
Christopher Brook (born 1979), American lawyer